Nightbitch is an upcoming comedy film directed and written by Marielle Heller and stars Amy Adams. The film is adapted from the 2021 novel of the same name by Rachel Yoder.

Synopsis
A woman taking care of her toddler begins to believe that she is turning into a canine.

Cast
 Amy Adams 
 Scoot McNairy
 Ella Thomas
 Garrett C. Phillips
 Mary Holland

Production

Development
In July 2020, Annapurna Pictures acquired the film rights to the then-unpublished Nightbitch, written by Rachel Yoder, with Amy Adams attached to star and produce. Stacy O'Neil of Adams' Bond Group Management production company will co-produce the film alongside Megan Ellison, Sue Naegle and Sammy Scher, while Yoder would serve as executive producer. Can You Ever Forgive Me? filmmaker Marielle Heller connected with Yoder's novel and began to quietly develop the film alongside Adams during the COVID-19 pandemic.

Pre-production
In March 2022, filming was scheduled to begin in the fall of that year. In May, the film shifted from Annapurna to Searchlight Pictures, who won out from five other bidders after purchasing the film rights for $25 million. At this time, Heller's involvement was officially confirmed. Christina Oh, Adam Paulsen, and Heller had boarded the film as producers, while Scher moved to executive producer with Havilah Brewster. On June 27, 2022, Scoot McNairy joined the film.

Filming
Production was intended to begin in September 2022 in Los Angeles, California. It began in October 2022, with the announcement of Ella Thomas and Garrett C. Phillips having joined the cast.<ref>{{Cite news |last=Taylor |first=Amanda |date=October 12, 2022 |title=Amy Adams Spotted on the Set of Her New Film Nightbitch' ' for the First time |work=People |url=https://people.com/movies/amy-adams-spotted-on-set-of-nightbitch/ |access-date=October 14, 2022}}</ref> On October 21, 2022, Mary Holland joined the cast.

ReleaseNightbitch'' will be released by Hulu.

References 

American horror thriller films
American psychological thriller films
Annapurna Pictures films
Upcoming English-language films
Searchlight Pictures films
Upcoming films
Films about dogs
Films based on American novels
Films produced by Megan Ellison
Films directed by Marielle Heller
Hulu original films